The A17 motorway is a motorway in the Netherlands. It runs from the interchange Klaverpolder, just south of the Moerdijk bridge in the A16 motorway, towards the interchange De Stok with the A58 motorway, near Roosendaal.

Overview
The A17 motorway is 25 kilometers long, and serves as an alternative route between the cities of Rotterdam and Antwerp, especially towards the latter's harbor, which is located in the western part of the city.

Exit list

References

External links

Motorways in the Netherlands
Motorways in North Brabant
Transport in Moerdijk
Transport in Roosendaal
Halderberge